The list of shipwrecks in 2002 includes ships sunk, foundered, grounded, or otherwise lost during 2002.

January

2 January

15 January

18 January

February

1 February

2 February

9 February

18 February

March

12 March

15 March

19 March

23 March

April

4 April

17 April

May

8 May

17 May

19 May

21 May

27 May

June

3 June

4 June

12 June

13 June

29 June

July

5 July

7 July

8 July

10 July

12 July

23 July

24 July

26 July

August

24 August

30 August

September

5 September

13 September

24 September

25 September

26 September

October

6 October

9 October

11 October

20 October

21 October

23 October

November

5 November

6 November

10 November

19 November

Unknown date

December

4 December

11 December

14 December

16 December

Unknown date

References

2002
Shipwrecks